Grupo Gigante is a holding listed at Mexican Stock Exchange founded in 1962, enterprises includes: Office Depot, The Home Store, SuperPrecio and Toks. The namesake hypermarkets and supermarkets are sold in 2008 to Soriana. Until December 2008, used to work with a joint venture with RadioShack.

History 

 1923: Comes from Spain to port of Veracruz, Ángel Losada Gómez; a 15-year-old who wanted to succeed in the business world.
 1940: Angel Losada Gomez founded "La Comercial" in Apan, Hidalgo in the state, foundations of the current Gigante. Currently, the store has Apan stay in the market under the name of “La Moderna”.
 1962: Birth of the first store “Gigante” in Mixcoac, with 64 departments, 250 employees and 65 office store.
 1971: The company diversified its activities by opening its first coffee family in Mexico City under the trade name of "Toks".
 1977: In this year, Gigante can operate 12 stores.
 1979: Gigante takes an important step, expanding in the rest of the country, opening its first store outside Mexico City in the city of Guadalajara, later expanding with 8 more stores. The Gigante slogan dates from this year.
 1980: Gigante bought the supermarket Maxi from Guadalajara. Between 1980 and 1990, it opened 9 stores in the cities of Querétaro, Celaya, Acapulco, Puebla, Salamanca and Morelia. In the late 1980s it already had 32 stores in operation in four cities.
 1981: Launches Gigante products "Selección Gigante" (white brand).
 1982: This year the company opened its first specialty restaurant. It now operates four specialty restaurants Mexican, Italian and Spanish: "El Campanario", "Tutto Bene", "La Viña del Quijote" and "Casa Rodrigo."
 1988: Gigante expands to Monterrey, Saltillo, Torreón, Nuevo Laredo, Reynosa, Durango, Ciudad Victoria, Matamoros, San Luis Potosí, Tijuana and Mexicali.
 1991: Gigante opened its 100 store in Toluca, becoming the first supermarket chain to achieve a hundred stores in operation, under one brand.
 1992: Grupo Gigante acquired stores "Blanco" and "El Sardinero"; thus strengthening its national presence. From the early 1990s, Gigante developed various formats, like their co-investments:
 Gigante
Bodega Gigante
Súper Gigante (before Súper G)
Súper Precio
Office Depot in partnership with Office Depot from the USA
RadioShack in partnership with Tandy Corporation
 2000: Gigante open market in the southeast of the country, with branches in Campeche, Yucatan, Tabasco, Chiapas and Quintana Roo. Starts the format “Super Gigante” with the first branch “Cumbres” in Monterrey city, as an evolution of the format "Super G".
 2001: Gigante continues to expand, adding to the group the chain stores “Super MAZ” in the southeast.
 2002: Grupo Gigante and PriceSmart Inc.  in a joint venture, opened the first three PriceSmart stores in the country, in Celaya, Irapuato, and Queretaro.
 2004: Gigante starts a new concept of store in their Coapa store.
 2005: In February the PriceSmart stores were closed, due to slow response of the market and lack of profits. (Celaya and Irapuato stores became Home Depot)
 2007: In a new strategy Grupo Gigante sold its supermarket stores to Organización Soriana which purchased represented more than 50% of the Gigante stores, this included the stores located in the United States. Grupo Gigante kept its joint ventures and “Super Precio” stores and created its new “Gigante Grupo Inmobiliario” (Gigante Real Estate Group).
 2008: Begins to operate, with the opening of the branch channel Tezontle Avenue in Mexico City, The Home Store format, dedicated to selling decorative items. Grupo Gigante sold to its partner, the Tandy Corporation U.S., its 50% of RadioShack stores in Mexico, specialized in selling electronics products.

See also 
 Official page of Grupo Gigante

References

Retail companies of Mexico